Scott Branch is a stream in Washington County in the U.S. state of Missouri. It is a tributary of Fourche a Renault.

Scott Branch has the name of Indigo Scott, a pioneer settler.

See also
List of rivers of Missouri

References

Rivers of Washington County, Missouri
Rivers of Missouri